The Haiyang Mountains, in ancient times known as "Yanghai Mountains" form a mountain range in the northeastern Guangxi separating West River drainage basin of the Xi River from the Xiang River drainage basin of the Yangtze River. The mountain range is located between Yuecheng Mountains and Dupang Mountains of Nanling Mountain Range, it is a major mountain range in Guilin, Guanxi, China. It runs south to north through Guanyang, Quanzhou, Xing'an, Lingchuan, Gongcheng and Yangshuo six counties.

Cutting through the Nanling Mountains, the Xianggui Corridor is the upper reaches of the Xiang and Li Rivers. The Left Branch of the upper Xiang River rises in the southwest of the Haiyang Mountains.

References

Mountains of Guangxi
Geography of Guilin